The women's competition in the light-heavyweight  (– 69 kg) division was staged on November 27, 2009.

Schedule

Medalists

Records

 Liu Chunhong's world records were rescinded in 2017.

Results

References
Results 

- Women's 69 kg, 2009 World Weightlifting Championships
World